David Bindman (born 1940) is emeritus Durning-Lawrence professor of the history of art at University College London and has been a research fellow at the Hutchins Center for African & African American Research (formerly W. E. B. Du Bois Research Institute) at Harvard University since 2010.

Early life
David Bindman was born in 1940. He was educated at Oxford University, Harvard University and the Courtauld Institute of Art, London.

Career
Bindman is emeritus professor of the history of art at University College London. In 2015, a festschrift was published in his honour by UCL Press, titled Burning Bright.

Selected publications
Blake as an artist. Phaidon, 1977. 
Hogarth. Thames & Hudson, London, 1981.
Shadow of the guillotine: Britain and the French Revolution. British Museum Publications, London, 1989. 
Roubiliac and the Eighteenth-Century Monument: Sculpture as Theatre. Yale University Press, New Haven, 1995. (With Malcolm Baker) 
Hogarth and his times: Serious comedy. British Museum Press, London, 1997. US: University of California Press.
William Blake: The complete illuminated books. Thames & Hudson, London, 2000. 
Ape to Apollo: Aesthetics and the idea of race in the 18th century. Cornell University Press, 2002. 
John Flaxman: Line into contour. Ikon Gallery, 2013.

References

Further reading
Burning bright: Essays in honour of David Bindman. Edited by Diana Dethloff, Tessa Murdoch and Kim Sloan, with Caroline Elam. UCL Press, London, 2015.  (Free pdf download)

Living people
Academics of University College London
British art historians
1940 births
Alumni of the University of Oxford
Alumni of the Courtauld Institute of Art
Harvard University alumni